Kirchendemenreuth is a municipality in the district of Neustadt an der Waldnaab in Bavaria, Germany. It includes the village (Dorf) of Steinreuth.

References

Neustadt an der Waldnaab (district)